Lionel Leo Hampton (April 20, 1908 – August 31, 2002) was an American jazz vibraphonist, pianist, percussionist, and bandleader. Hampton worked with jazz musicians from Teddy Wilson, Benny Goodman, and Buddy Rich, to Charlie Parker, Charles Mingus, and Quincy Jones. In 1992, he was inducted into the Alabama Jazz Hall of Fame, and he was awarded the National Medal of Arts in 1996.

Biography

Early life
Lionel Hampton was born in 1908 in Louisville, Kentucky, and was raised by his mother. Shortly after he was born, he and his mother moved to her hometown of Birmingham, Alabama. He spent his early childhood in Kenosha, Wisconsin, before he and his family moved to Chicago, Illinois, in 1916. As a youth, Hampton was a member of the Bud Billiken Club, an alternative to the Boy Scouts of America, which was off-limits because of racial segregation. 

During the 1920s, while still a teenager, Hampton took xylophone lessons from Jimmy Bertrand and began to  play drums. Hampton was raised Catholic, and started out playing fife and drum at the Holy Rosary Academy near Chicago.

Early career
Lionel Hampton began his career playing drums for the Chicago Defender Newsboys' Band (led by Major N. Clark Smith) while still a teenager in Chicago. While he lived in Chicago, Hampton saw Louis Armstrong at the Vendome, recalling that the entire audience went crazy after his first solo. 

He moved to California in 1927 or 1928, playing drums for the Dixieland Blues-Blowers. He made his recording debut with The Quality Serenaders led by Paul Howard, then left for Culver City and drummed for the Les Hite band at Sebastian's Cotton Club. One of his trademarks as a drummer was his ability to do stunts with multiple pairs of sticks such as twirling and juggling without missing a beat. 

During this period, he began practicing on the vibraphone. In 1930 Louis Armstrong came to California and hired the Les Hite band for performances and recordings. Armstrong was impressed with Hampton's playing after Hampton reproduced Armstrong's solo on the vibraphone and asked him to play behind him like that during vocal choruses. So began his career as a vibraphonist, popularizing the use of the instrument in the process. Invented ten years earlier, the vibraphone is essentially a xylophone with metal bars, a sustain pedal, and resonators equipped with electric-powered fans that add tremolo.

While working with the Les Hite band, Hampton also occasionally did some performing with Nat Shilkret and his orchestra. During the early 1930s, he studied music at the University of Southern California. In 1934 he led his own orchestra, and then appeared in the Bing Crosby film Pennies From Heaven (1936) alongside Louis Armstrong (wearing a mask in a scene while playing drums).

With Benny Goodman

Also in November 1936, the Benny Goodman Orchestra came to Los Angeles to play the Palomar Ballroom. When John Hammond brought Goodman to see Hampton perform, Goodman invited him to join his trio, which soon became the Benny Goodman Quartet with pianist Teddy Wilson and drummer Gene Krupa completing the lineup. The Trio and Quartet were among the first racially integrated jazz groups to perform before audiences, and were a leading small group of the day.

During his nearly four years with Goodman, Hampton became a household name in the swing world, not only adding fire, color and inventive ideas to Goodman's quartet and occasionally filling in on drums with the big band, but staying long enough to be one of the stars at Goodman's famed Carnegie Hall concert in 1938, and to be part of the clarinetist's sextet with the pioneering electric guitarist Charlie Christian. At the same time, Hampton led a series of mostly superb all-star sessions for the Victor label.

Lionel Hampton Orchestra

While Hampton worked for Goodman in New York, he recorded with several different small groups known as the Lionel Hampton Orchestra, as well as assorted small groups within the Goodman band. In 1940 Hampton left the Goodman organization under amicable circumstances to form his own big band.

Hampton's orchestra developed a high profile during the 1940s and early 1950s. His third recording with them in 1942 produced the version of "Flying Home", featuring a solo by Illinois Jacquet that anticipated rhythm & blues. Although Hampton first recorded "Flying Home" under his own name with a small group in 1940 for Victor, the best known version is the big band version recorded for Decca on May 26, 1942, in a new arrangement by Hampton's pianist Milt Buckner. The 78 RPM disc became successful enough for Hampton to record "Flyin' Home #2" in 1944, this time a feature for Arnett Cobb. The song went on to become the theme song for all three men. 

Guitarist Billy Mackel first joined Hampton in 1944, and would perform and record with him almost continuously through to the late 1970s. In 1947, Hamp performed "Stardust" at a "Just Jazz" concert for producer Gene Norman, also featuring Charlie Shavers and Slam Stewart; the recording was issued by Decca. Later, Norman's GNP Crescendo label issued the remaining tracks from the concert.

Hampton was a featured artist at numerous Cavalcade of Jazz concerts held at Wrigley Field in Los Angeles and produced by Leon Hefflin Sr. His first performance was at the second Cavalcade of Jazz concert held on October 12, 1946, and also featured Jack McVea, Slim Gaillard, T-Bone Walker, the Honeydrippers and Louis Armstrong. 

The fifth Cavalcade of Jazz concert was held in two locations, Wrigley Field in Los Angeles and Lane Field in San Diego, July 10, 1949, and September 3, 1949, respectively.  Betty Carter, Jimmy Witherspoon, Buddy Banks, Smiley Turner and Big Jay McNeely also played with Hampton.  

It was at the sixth Cavalcade of Jazz, June 25, 1950, that Hampton's playing precipitated the closest thing to a riot in the show's eventful history. Lionel and his band paraded around the ball park's infield playing ‘Flying High’. The huge crowd, around 14,000, went berserk, tossed cushions, coats, hats, programs, and just about anything else they could lay hands on and swarmed on the field. Dinah Washington, Roy Milton, PeeWee Crayton, Lillie Greenwood, Tiny Davis and Her Hell Divers were also featured. 

His final Cavalcade of Jazz concert held on July 24, 1955 (Eleventh) also featured Big Jay McNeely, The Medallions, The Penguins and James Moody and his Orchestra.

From the mid-1940s until the early 1950s, Hampton led a lively rhythm & blues band whose Decca Records recordings included numerous young performers who later had significant careers. They included bassist Charles Mingus, saxophonist Johnny Griffin, guitarist Wes Montgomery, vocalist Dinah Washington, and vocal stylist "Little" Jimmy Scott. Other noteworthy band members were trumpeters Dizzy Gillespie, Cat Anderson, Kenny Dorham, and Snooky Young, trombonist Jimmy Cleveland, and saxophonists Jerome Richardson and Curtis Lowe.

The Hampton orchestra that toured Europe in 1953 included Clifford Brown, Gigi Gryce, Anthony Ortega, Monk Montgomery, George Wallington, Art Farmer, Quincy Jones, and singer Annie Ross. Hampton continued to record with small groups and jam sessions during the 1940s and 1950s, with Oscar Peterson, Buddy DeFranco, and others. In 1955, while in California working on The Benny Goodman Story he recorded with Stan Getz and made two albums with Art Tatum for Norman Granz as well as with his own big band.

Hampton performed with Louis Armstrong and Italian singer Lara Saint Paul at the 1968 Sanremo Music Festival in Italy. The performance created a sensation with Italian audiences, as it broke into a real jazz session. That same year, Hampton received a Papal Medal from Pope Paul VI.

Later career

During the 1960s, Hampton's groups were in decline; he was still performing what had succeeded for him earlier in his career. He did not fare much better in the 1970s, though he recorded actively for his Who's Who in Jazz record label, which he founded in 1977/1978.

Beginning in February 1984, Hampton and his band played at the University of Idaho's annual jazz festival, which was renamed the Lionel Hampton Jazz Festival the following year. In 1987, the UI's school of music was renamed for Hampton, the first university music school named for a jazz musician.

During much of the 1980s, some notable sidemen in Hampton's orchestra included Thomas Chapin, Paul Jeffrey, Frankie Dunlop, Arvell Shaw, John Colianni, Oliver Jackson and George Duvivier. Hampton remained active until a stroke in Paris in 1991 led to a collapse on stage. That incident, combined with years of chronic arthritis, forced him to cut back drastically on performances. However, he did play at the Smithsonian National Museum of American History in 2001 shortly before his death.

Hampton died from congestive heart failure at Mount Sinai Hospital, New York City, on August 31, 2002. He was interred at the Woodlawn Cemetery, Bronx, New York. His funeral was held on September 7, 2002, and featured a performance by Wynton Marsalis and David Ostwald's Gully Low Jazz Band at Riverside Church in Manhattan; the procession began at The Cotton Club in Harlem.

Personal life

On November 11, 1936, in Yuma, Arizona, Lionel Hampton married Gladys Riddle (1913–1971). Gladys was Lionel's business manager throughout much of his career. Many musicians recall that Lionel ran the music and Gladys ran the business.

Around 1945 or 1946, he handed a pair of vibraphone mallets to then-five year old (later jazz musician) Roy Ayers.

During the 1950s he had a strong interest in Judaism and raised money for Israel. In 1953 he composed a King David suite and performed it in Israel with the Boston Pops Orchestra. Later in life Hampton became a Christian Scientist. Hampton was also a Thirty-third degree Prince Hall freemason.

In January 1997, his apartment caught fire and destroyed his awards and belongings; Hampton escaped uninjured.

Charity
Hampton was deeply involved in the construction of various public housing projects, and founded the Lionel Hampton Development Corporation. Construction  began with the Lionel Hampton Houses in Harlem, New York, in the 1960s, with the help of then Republican governor Nelson Rockefeller. Hampton's wife, Gladys Hampton, also was involved in construction of a housing project in her name, the Gladys Hampton Houses. Gladys died in 1971. In the 1980s, Hampton built another housing project called Hampton Hills in Newark, New Jersey.

Hampton was a staunch Republican and served as a delegate to several Republican National Conventions. He served as vice-chairman of the New York Republican County Committee for some years and also was a member of the New York City Human Rights Commission. He served as Director of Special Events for Gerald Ford's 1976 re-election campaign. Hampton donated almost $300,000 to Republican campaigns and committees throughout his lifetime. However, in 1996 he endorsed Clinton/Gore, saying that the Republican party, which he had joined because it was the party of Lincoln, no longer represented moderates like himself.

Awards

 2021 – Grammy Lifetime Achievement Award (posthumous)
 2001 – Harlem Jazz and Music Festival's Legend Award
 1996 – International Jazz Hall of Fame Induction and Award (performed "Flying  Home" with Illinois Jacquet and the Count Basie Orchestra)
 1996 – National Medal of Arts presented by President Bill Clinton
 1995 – Honorary Commissioner of Civil Rights by George Pataki
 1995 – Honorary Doctorate from the New England Conservatory of Music
 1993 – Honorary Doctorate from the University of Maryland Eastern Shore
 1992 – Inducted into the Alabama Jazz Hall of Fame
 1992 – "Contributions To The Cultural Life of the Nation" award from John F. Kennedy Center for the Performing Arts
 1988 – The National Endowment for the Arts Jazz Masters Fellowship
 1988 – The National Association of Jazz Educators Hall of Fame Award
 1987 – Honorary Doctorate of Humanities from the University of Idaho – UI's School of Music renamed "Lionel Hampton School of Music"
 1987 – The Roy Wilkins Memorial Award from the NAACP
 1986 – The "One of a Kind" Award from Broadcast Music, Inc.
 1984 – Jazz Hall of Fame Award from the Institute of Jazz Studies
 1984 – Honorary Doctorate of Music from USC
 1983 – The International Film and Television Festival of New York City Award
 1983 – Honorary Doctorate of Humane Letters from the State University of New York
 1982 – Hollywood Walk of Fame Star
 1981 – Honorary Doctorate of Humanities from Glassboro State College
 1979 – Honorary Doctorate of Music from Howard University
 1978 – Bronze Medallion from New York City
 1976 – Honorary Doctorate of Humanities from Daniel Hale Williams University
 1975 – Honorary Doctorate of Music from Xavier University of Louisiana
 1974 – Honorary Doctorate of Fine Arts from Pepperdine University
 1968 – Papal Medal from Pope Paul VI
 1966 – Handel Medallion
 1957 – American Goodwill Ambassador by President Dwight D. Eisenhower
 1954 – Israel's Statehood Award

Discography

Compilations & original issues

Other compilations

The Chronological ... Classics series
note: every recording by Lionel Hampton & His Orchestra is included in this 12 volume series from the CLASSICS reissue label ... 
 The Chronological Lionel Hampton & His Orchestra 1937–1938 (#524) - RCA Victor recordings
 The Chronological Lionel Hampton & His Orchestra 1938–1939 (#534) - RCA Victor recordings
 The Chronological Lionel Hampton & His Orchestra 1939–1940 (#562) - RCA Victor recordings
 The Chronological Lionel Hampton & His Orchestra 1940–1941 (#624) - RCA Victor recordings; first Decca session
 The Chronological Lionel Hampton & His Orchestra 1942–1944 (#803) - Decca recordings
 The Chronological Lionel Hampton & His Orchestra 1945–1946 (#922) - Decca recordings
 The Chronological Lionel Hampton & His Orchestra 1946 (#946) - Decca recordings
 The Chronological Lionel Hampton & His Orchestra 1947 (#994) - Decca recordings
 The Chronological Lionel Hampton & His Orchestra 1949–1950 (#1161) - Decca recordings
 The Chronological Lionel Hampton & His Orchestra 1950 (#1193) - Decca recordings
 The Chronological Lionel Hampton & His Orchestra 1950–1951 (#1262) - last two Decca sessions; MGM recordings
 The Chronological Lionel Hampton & His Orchestra 1951–1953 (#1429) - includes Hamp's first Norman Granz-produced quartet session (September 2, 1953) with Oscar Peterson, Ray Brown, and Buddy Rich.

Glad-Hamp Records
 GHLP-1001 (1961) The Many Sides Of Hamp
 GHLP-3050 (1962) All That Twist'n Jazz
 GHLP-1003 (1962) The Exciting Hamp In Europe
 GHLP-1004 (1963) Bossa Nova Jazz
 GHLP-1005 (1963) Recorded Live On Tour
 GHLP-1006 (1964) Hamp In Japan/Live
 GHLP-1007 (1965) East Meets West (Introducing Miyoko Hoshino)
 GHLP-1009 (1965) A Taste Of Hamp
 GHS-1011 (1967) Hamp Stamps [includes "Greasy Greens"]
 GHS-1012 (1966) Hamp's Portrait Of A Woman
 GHS-1020 (1979) Hamp's Big Band Live!
 GHS-1021 (1980) Chameleon
 GHS-1022 (1982) Outrageous
 GHS-1023 (1983) Live In Japan
 GHS-1024 (1984) Ambassador At Large
 GHS-1025 (1985) Sentimental Journey (Featuring Sylvia Bennett)
 GHS-1026 (1988) One Of A Kind
 GHS-1027 (1987) Midnight Blues - with Dexter Gordon
 GHCD-1028 (1990) Cookin' In The Kitchen

As sideman
With Frank Sinatra
 L.A. Is My Lady (Qwest/Warner Bros., 1984)

Filmography
Hampton appeared as himself in the films listed below.

References

External links
 
 Lionel Hampton at Drummersworld
 
 Lionel Hampton: His Life and Legacy at University of Idaho
 Lionel Hampton Library Collection, part of the International Jazz Collections at the University of Idaho Library
 Christopher Popa, "Lionel Hampton: Music Was His Fountain of Youth," Big Band Library
 Photos at Jazzhouse.org
 Lionel Hampton interview on BBC Radio 4 Desert Island Discs, September 17, 1983
 
 Lionel Hampton Interview NAMM Oral History Library (1989)
 Lionel Hampton recordings at the Discography of American Historical Recordings. 

1908 births
2002 deaths
African-American jazz musicians
American Prince Hall Freemasons
Alabama Republicans
American Christian Scientists
American jazz bandleaders
American jazz vibraphonists
Big band bandleaders
Burials at Woodlawn Cemetery (Bronx, New York)
Kennedy Center honorees
Kentucky Republicans
Musicians from Louisville, Kentucky
New York blues musicians
New York (state) Republicans
Musicians from Birmingham, Alabama
Swing bandleaders
Timeless Records artists
United States National Medal of Arts recipients
USC Thornton School of Music alumni
American jazz drummers
Audio Fidelity Records artists
Jazz musicians from Kentucky
20th-century American drummers
American male drummers
Converts to Christian Science from Roman Catholicism
Jazz musicians from Alabama
American male jazz musicians
Bluebird Records artists
Black & Blue Records artists
20th-century American male musicians
African-American Catholics
Grammy Lifetime Achievement Award winners
Jazz vibraphonists